Morozov is a rural locality (a khutor) in Soldatsky Selsoviet Rural Settlement, Fatezhsky District, Kursk Oblast, Russia. The population as of 2010 is 37.

Geography 
The khutor is located on the Ruda River (a link tributary of the Usozha in the basin of the Svapa), 88 km from the Russia–Ukraine border, 43 km north-west of Kursk, 16 km south-west of the district center – the town Fatezh, 12 km from the selsoviet center – Soldatskoye.

Climate
Morozov has a warm-summer humid continental climate (Dfb in the Köppen climate classification).

Transport 
Morozov is located 15 km from the federal route  Crimea Highway as part of the European route E105, 14 km from the road of regional importance  (Fatezh – Dmitriyev), on the road of intermunicipal significance  (38K-038 – Soldatskoye – Shuklino), 26 km from the nearest railway halt 552 km (railway line Navlya – Lgov-Kiyevsky).

The rural locality is situated 48 km from Kursk Vostochny Airport, 158 km from Belgorod International Airport and 245 km from Voronezh Peter the Great Airport.

References

Notes

Sources

Rural localities in Fatezhsky District